Dionysio Miseroni von Lison (1607, Prague – 1661, Prague) was a Bohemian-Italian jeweler, gemcutter, and glass cutter. He was a member of very famous Miseroni family who were important jewelers and gemcutters from Milan: the archive information for the Milanese Miseroni family dates back to the 15th century, when there is traces, in 1453, of Giovanni Francesco or Francesco, son of Gasparo, mentioned in 1460 as a member of the goldsmiths' guild, of which he was appointed consul in 1468 and 1475, and abbas in 1480 and again in 1488.

Biography

He was the son of the stonecutter Ottavio Miseroni from Lissone near Monza, who settled in Prague and founded a gemstone mill in Prague - Bubeneč. He succeeded his father and became a gemcutter and Imperial Treasure Warden in the Prague Castle. He moved to Vienna after Ferdinand III died, but returned back to Prague. He was buried in the church of Saint Mary Magdalena in Prague-Malá Strana. He was succeeded in his workshop by his son Ferdinand Eusebius Miseroni.

Works 
 Salt or balm container, cut emerald in poids of 2860 carats, mounted in gold, Kunsthistorisches Museum Vienna
 Rock crystal vase in a form of pyramide, Kunsthistorisches Museum Vienna
 Baptismal set of lapis lazuli, Kunsthistorisches Museum Vienna
 Pair of vases with flowers, agate, jasper and topas, Kunsthistorisches Museum Vienna  
 Bowl with a triton figurine, cut jasper, white enamel, gold; Walters Art Museum Baltimore 
 Cameos

References

Literature 
 Heinrich Klapsia, Dionysio Miseroni, Jahrbuch des Kaiserhauses SAK, N.F. XIII., 1944, p. 301–358.
 Rudolf Distelberger, Manfred-Leithe-Jaspers: The Kunsthistorisches Museum in Vienna, the imperial and ecclesiastic Treasury. Vienna 1997, p. 7.   
 Stanislav Urban, Řezáči drahých kamenů (Gemcutters). Museum of applied arts in Prague 1976, s. 90–95 (in Czech)

1607 births
1661 deaths
Artists from Prague
Businesspeople from Prague
Jewellers